The Bravery Star in Silver, post-nominal letters BSS, was instituted by the President of the Republic of South Africa in April 1996. It was awarded to veteran cadres of the Azanian People's Liberation Army, the military wing of the Pan Africanist Congress, who had distinguished themselves during "the struggle" by performing acts of bravery.

Azanian People's Liberation Army
The Azanian People's Liberation Army (APLA) was the para-military wing of the Pan Africanist Congress (PAC). It was established in 1961 to wage an armed "struggle" against the Nationalist government inside South Africa. On 27 April 1994 the Azanian People's Liberation Army was amalgamated with six other military forces into the South African National Defence Force (SANDF).

Institution
The Bravery Star in Silver, post-nominal letters BSS, was instituted by the President of South Africa in April 1996. It is the middle award of a set of three decorations for bravery, along with the Gold Star for Bravery and the Star for Conspicuous Leadership.

The Azanian People's Liberation Army's military decorations and medals were modeled on those of the Republic of South Africa and these three decorations are the approximate equivalents of, respectively, the Honoris Crux Gold, the Honoris Crux (1975) and the Pro Virtute Decoration.

Award criteria
The decoration could be awarded to veteran cadres of the Azanian People's Liberation Army who had distinguished themselves during "the struggle" by performing acts of bravery.

Order of wear

The position of the Bravery Star in Silver in the official military and national orders of precedence was revised upon the institution of a new set of honours on 27 April 2003, but it remained unchanged.

Azanian People's Liberation Army
  
Official APLA order of precedence:
 Preceded by the Gold Star for Bravery (GSB).
 Succeeded by the Star for Conspicuous Leadership (SCL).

South African National Defence Force until 26 April 2003
Official SANDF order of precedence:
  
 Preceded by the Cross for Bravery of the Republic of Transkei.
 Succeeded by the Star for Bravery in Silver (SBS) of Umkhonto we Sizwe.
Official national order of precedence:
 Preceded by the Police Cross for Bravery (PCF) of the Republic of South Africa.
 Succeeded by the Star for Bravery in Silver (SBS) of Umkhonto we Sizwe.

Description
Obverse
The Bravery Star in Silver is a pair of five-pointed stars, superimposed one on the other and struck in silver to fit inside a circle with a diameter of 38 millimetres, displaying a silver lion on a ruby red enameled centre roundel.

Reverse
The reverse is smooth and displays the embellished pre-1994 South African Coat of Arms.

Ribbon
The ribbon is 32 millimetres wide and red, with a 12 millimetres wide gold band in the centre.

Discontinuation
Conferment of the Bravery Star in Silver was discontinued upon the institution of a new set of honours on 27 April 2003.

References

Military decorations and medals of Azanian People's Liberation Army
Awards established in 1996